Chanokh Heynekh HaKohen Levin (1798 – 21 March 1870) of Aleksander served as the rebbe of a community of thousands of Hasidim during the "interregnum" between the Chidushei HaRim of Ger and the Sfas Emes.

Biography 

Levin was one of the leading students of the Rebbe Reb Simcha Bunim of Peshischa. After the latter's death he became one of the most prominent followers of Rebbe Menachem Mendel of Kotzk and the senior disciple of Chidushei haRim. Following the death of the Chidushei haRim in 1866, the bulk of his numerous chasidim chose Rabbi Chanokh Heynekh as the next rebbe.

Levin served as the Rabbi in the Jewish communities of Aleksander from approximately 1837 until 1853, Nowy Dwór from 1853 through 1859, and Przasnysz from 1859 until 1864 (or 1866). After his tenure in Przasnysz he retired from the rabbinate and settled in Aleksander, where he lived during his period of leadership as rebbe.

His teachings are collected in Chashava Letova (first published in 1929), and are quoted widely.

References

External links 
 Rav-SIG Index of names
 Yehuda Leyb, Geza Pe-eir (includes biographical notes on Chanokh Heynekh)
 Prushnits Yizkor Book

Rebbes of Ger
Polish Hasidic rabbis
19th-century Polish rabbis
1798 births
1870 deaths
Kohanim writers of Rabbinic literature
People from Pabianice County